Ambrosia tomentosa, the skeletonleaf bur ragweed, silverleaf povertyweed, or skeleton-leaf bursage, is a North American species of perennial plants in the family Asteraceae.

Skeletonleaf bur ragweed is native to the west-central part of the United States, primarily the western Great Plains, the Colorado Plateau, and eastern Great Basin. It is often found growing alongside roads and in the sandy parts of plains.

It is considered a noxious weed in several states. It is also considered a severe allergen.

Description
Ambrosia tomentos grows up to 3 feet (91 cm) tall.  The deeply lobed hairy leaves grow to 5 inches (12.7 cm) and have toothed margins. Flowers are small and yellow and produce spined 2-seeded burrs.  In addition to seeds it can also reproduce via its widely spreading roots.

References

External links

tomentosa
Flora of the Western United States
Flora of the North-Central United States
Flora of the United States
Flora of the South-Central United States
Flora of the Great Basin
Flora of the Great Plains (North America)
Plants described in 1818
Taxa named by Thomas Nuttall